Aegiphila sordida is a species of flowering plant in the family Lamiaceae. It is endemic to Peru.

References

sordida
Endemic flora of Peru
Least concern plants
Taxonomy articles created by Polbot